Rekowo may refer to the following places in Poland:

In Masovian Voivodeship (east-central Poland):
Rekowo, Masovian Voivodeship

In Pomeranian Voivodeship (north Poland):
Rekowo, Bytów County
Rekowo, Kartuzy County
Rękowo

In West Pomeranian Voivodeship (north-west Poland):
Rekowo, Gmina Kamień Pomorski 
Rekowo, Gmina Wolin
Rekowo, Koszalin County
Rekowo, Łobez County
Rekowo, Stargard County